Kin is the fifth studio album by Scottish singer-songwriter KT Tunstall. It was released on 9 September 2016 worldwide, following up her previous album, the folk-toned Invisible Empire // Crescent Moon. It was preceded by the Golden State EP, which included one of the songs from the album, "Evil Eye". The album was produced by Tony Hoffer in a studio in Los Angeles.

It peaked at number 7 on the UK and Scottish album charts and number 96 in Switzerland.

Background 
Tunstall announced through Facebook in 2015 that a new record would be released in 2016. However, no title track, title album or release date was announced. She also revealed she was working with producer Tony Hoffer during a few chat live with the fans, where she even played live the song "Feel It All" and what was next going to be the promotional single "Evil Eye".

She recorded the album in a studio in Atwater Village, Los Angeles, a place that inspired her a lot of songs, according to her. After her fourth studio album Invisible Empire // Crescent Moon, two years before the album release, Tunstall had considered quitting the album music industry in order to write music for movies. She had entered the Sundance Institute's elite Film Composers Lab in order to give her career another direction. She admitted in an interview with Broadway World: "I stopped. I gave up. I didn't want to do it anymore."

Two years later Kin was born. Produced by Tony Hoffer (Beck, Fitz and the Tantrums, Air, M83 and more), and written and recorded by Tunstall in L.A. "The truth is, I've finally made peace with being a pop songwriter," Tunstall says. "This record was very much embracing my dharma as an artist, which is to write positive songs that have muscle, but also show their vulnerability."

Kin is the first album in a trilogy of records by Tunstall, which all cover the themes of "soul, body and mind."

Songs and singles 
The album is composed of eleven tracks. The lead single off Kin is called "Maybe It's a Good Thing". The song was released on 15 July, and a clip video was released on 1 August. Along with the single release, an acoustic version and as well as a "Bit Funk Remix".

The promotional single "Evil Eye" is also on the album. It was the very first song to be released from the album, but it was initially released as a single from the Golden State EP. Another promotional song was released on 19 August, It Took Me So Long to Get Here, But Here I Am. The song then became a single in November 2016. A music video was broadcast on 30 November 2016.

Following "Maybe It's a Good Thing", Tunstall announced that the first radio broadcast for her second single, "Hard Girls", would premiere on the Zoë Ball show for BBC Radio. A music video of the song, featuring Melanie C from the Spice Girls, was broadcast on 13 September 2016.

The song "Love Is an Ocean" was also released as a single, with a video on 17 November. The song is a ballad that closes the album.

Another notable song is the duet, "Two Way", with 2016 Grammy Award nominee, James Bay. Bay and Tunstall met during Jools Holland's Hootenanny. Tunstall had read in an interview that he was a fan of hers, so she chatted with him and they decided to record a duet. Tunstall says in an interview with the UK newspaper Evening Standard that Bay is "one of the most talented new songwriters," and added "it was fantastic to work with him.". "Kin" is the title track of the album, and it is a ballad. Tunstall describes it as one of her favourite tracks, and wanted to name the album from this song.

Critical reception 

At Metacritic, which assigns a normalised rating out of 100 to reviews from mainstream publications, the album has an average score of 72 based on 6 reviews, indicating "generally favorable reviews".

Among the positive reviews, Rolling Stone magazine wrote "At its best, the album is a power-pop gem. [...] Kin clicks when Tunstall's vocals dig deep on tracks like "Evil Eye" and "Run on Home," and when she and James Bay strike a sexy, slow-rolling groove on "Two Way," it makes an awfully good case for going back to Cali." The magazine rewarded the album with 3,5 stars out of 5. Yahoo! also gave a good review of the album, stating "Embracing her rock-pop gifts, Tunstall seems at peace — and we're the beneficiaries. It may have taken her long to get here but KIN shows it was worth it." AllMusic, who gave the album four stars, wrote "What gives Kin its weight is Tunstall's craft. Invisible Empire // Crescent Moon proved that she could turn inward and be gripping, but by turning that aesthetic inside out -- this is an album about embracing the outside world -- she's every bit as compelling. "

The Irish Times however criticised the album and Tunstall for losing "some of her va-va-voom" and saying further "The Scot's sixth album is a departure from the melancholy, bare-boned folk of her last (double) album, Invisible Empire // Crescent Moon, but that's not necessarily a good thing."

Commercial performance 
Shortly after its release, Kin was ranked number 5 on the Official UK Albums Update midweek chart, and finally peaked at number 7 on the UK Albums Chart. Sales in the UK were better than her previous album Invisible Empire // Crescent Moon, which peaked at number 14 in the UK in 2013. It is Tunstall's fourth top 10 album in the UK after Eye to the Telescope and Drastic Fantastic peaked at number 3, and Tiger Suit at number 5.

Track listing

Personnel 
KT Tunstall - vocals, guitars, keyboards, bass, programming, flute, synths
Tony Hoffer - guitar, programming, synths, bass
James Bay - vocals (7), guitar (7)
Dave MacLean - programming, organ
Denny Weston Jr. - drums, percussion
Dave Palmer - organ, synths, keyboards, synth bass
Joseph Karnes - bass
Charlotte Hatherley - electric guitar, ambient guitar
David Campbell - strings arrangement (9)

Charts

Release history

References 

2016 albums
KT Tunstall albums
albums produced by Tony Hoffer
Caroline Records albums